Butler Township is one of the fourteen townships of Mercer County, Ohio, United States.  The 2000 census found 6,459 people in the township, 1,977 of whom lived in the unincorporated portions of the township.

Geography
Located in the south central part of the county, it borders the following townships:
Jefferson Township - north
Franklin Township - east
Marion Township - southeast
Granville Township - south
Recovery Township - southwest
Washington Township - northwest

The village of Coldwater is located in central Butler Township.

Name and history
.Butler Township was organized in 1838. It is one of six Butler Townships statewide.

Government
The township is governed by a three-member board of trustees, who are elected in November of odd-numbered years to a four-year term beginning on the following January 1. Two are elected in the year after the presidential election and one is elected in the year before it. There is also an elected township fiscal officer, who serves a four-year term beginning on April 1 of the year after the election, which is held in November of the year before the presidential election. Vacancies in the fiscal officership or on the board of trustees are filled by the remaining trustees.

References

External links
County website

Townships in Mercer County, Ohio
Townships in Ohio